Ayo Ayoola-Amale is a Nigerian poet and lawyer.

Early life and education
Ayo Ayoola-Amale was born Adebisi Ayo Adekeye in Jos, Nigeria.

She joined the peace movement at a very young age and became the Lead of Rotaract club and Girls Guide as a teenager when Girl Guiding groups were set up with a focus to work on social justice issues, such as violence against women and girls. She was a member of Rotary club and Women in Nigeria (WIN).

Her father, a graduate of University of London, was a lawyer and a career State Security Officer who served Nigeria as the National Security Adviser, Security Adviser to the Vice President and Director of State Security Service. He has been honoured with several awards, including Intelligence awards from the United States. He is currently the CEO of a top security outfit and chairman of other companies. Her mother, a Princess, was a businesswoman.

At the age of 10, Ayoola-Amale moved to Northern Nigeria as a result of her father's official posting, where she grew up in an exclusive government reserved area of Kano. Young Ayo loved books and she read voraciously and widely. She was a pupil of St Louis Secondary School, Bompai, Kano. 

She studied law at Obafemi Awolowo University, and was called to the bar in 1993. She later attended the University of Lagos, where she earned her first LLM degree and University of Ghana graduating with an LLM (ADR).

Career 
Ayoola-Amale is a lawyer, conflict-resolution professional, ombudsman, certified facilitator and the lead, first conflict-resolution services, Inc. She is a member of the Chartered Institute of Arbitrators, UK. She was a Senior Lecturer and Head of Department of Law, Faculty of Law, Kings University College, Wisconsin University and Ghana Technology University College, Accra, Ghana

As a lawyer and conflict resolution professional 
Ayoola-Amale has worked in law in Nigeria, Ghana and Senegal. She was Partner and Head of the Commercial Law department at Ayo, Ajibulu and Co., Legal Practitioners and Notaries, Lagos and Bayo Ayorinde and Co., Legal Practitioners, Lagos. Ayo is Ombudsman and Mediator for Mediators beyond Borders International, U.S.A. She has presented papers at various local and international conferences on Conflict Resolution, Property & Commercial Law and practice, Peace Education, Women Peace and Security, etc. She was the Legal Advisor of the Ghana Association of Writers (GAW), Accra.

Work

Peace building work
She founded the Women International League for Peace and Freedom (WILPF), Ghana Section, and is currently the President. Ayo is the International Association of Educators for World Peace (IAEWP) Senior Vice-President for Africa & Regional Chairperson for Africa of the Diplomatic Commission of IAEWP (NGO ECOSOC – United Nations) IAEWP – The 1987 recipient of Peace Messenger Award of the UN. She is the past National Chancellor, (IAEWP) Nigeria Chapter and former International Vice- President for West-Africa (IAEWP).

Ayo is the Global Harmony Association (GHA) Vice-President, GHA Africa President. She was also the Ex-CEO of Pearl-Allied Group of Company, Nigeria (1996–2008).  She is a Member of International team of Dedicated Experts, One humanity Institute, Auschwitz-Oswiecim, Poland, Member of Advisory Council of Leaders, International Cities of Peace, USA, Member of the International Advisory Board of World Constitution and Parliament Association (WCPA), Member of International Advisory board of Sri Ramanuja Mission Trust, India.

She is the Ambassador of the Love Foundation, UK and was part of the Love begins with me UK interview series part 1 & 2.

She serves on the Central Advisory Committee of the Existential Harmony & Interdisciplinary Research Project and World Conference 2015. She was the National Secretary, Coalition of NGOs Associated with UN-DPI Ghana and the Legal Adviser for Ghana Federation of the Disabled, A voluntary service she renders for humanity). Ayo is also an executive member of the National Peace Council (Universal Peace Federation International Ghana Chapter). She was the Regional Representative for the World Mediation Organization. Currently she is a Fellow of WMO.  Ayo is the Member of, International Editorial Board of Poetry and Peace Journal, International Society for Intercultural Studies and Research (ISISAR), and has contributed chapters to Global peace books, she is a chapter contributor to ISISAR Journals, Handbook of Research Examining Global Peacemaking in the Global Age, Global Peace Science etc. She has attended several Mediation and peace building conferences, nationally and internationally.

Literary work
In 2010, Ayo, founded Splendors of Dawn Poetry Foundation and, along with Nigerian Poet and writer, Diego Odoh Okenyodo, co-founded the West Africa Poetry Prize (WAPP) in 2013, of which she is a director. She is the editor and co-publisher of the anthology "Notes of a Baobab" from the stable of Butterflies and Elephants on Moon, Forum of Science and the Arts and a member of the editorial board of Wuerzart Literary journal, Germany. She is the CEO of Heritage & On the Pathway Series- Every Child's fables, Poems, Nursery Rhymes and Plays.

Ayo Ayoola-Amale is the author of six volumes of poems and a play and has performed her poetry at national and international events. Some of her literary works include Broken Dreams (2011), a play, Life Script, a collection of poems with some published online. She is the Vice- President, Africa of the Poets of World, Executive member, World Poetry Movement, International Pen, Mbassem Women Writers Forum and  FIDA. She was the Legal Advisor of Ghana Association of Writers.

In May 2013, Ayo and Splendors Performance Poetry Team were participants at the Yari Yari Ntoaso – Continuing the Dialogue, International Conference in Accra, Ghana.

In 2013 Ayo was the organiser of "100 thousand poets for change" in Accra. She was a guest poet at the Medellin International Poetry Festival, Kistrech Poetry Festival in Kenya and International literary festivals. Her poems have appeared in national and international anthologies, journals, and magazines and has been translated into several languages.

Personal life 
She took the surname Amale when she got married. Presently, she is a resident in Accra.

Awards
 Universal Ambassador for Peace (Award from Universal Peace Federation International)
 2013 – Awarded the Honourable Global Mediator (World Mediation Organization) Berlin, Germany, in recognition of her selfless service to humanity and her commitment to peace.
 IAEWP World Peace Ambassador, IAEWP – The 1987 recipient of Peace Messenger Award of the UN
 Ambassador, the Love Foundation, UK – 2011
 Academy of Universal Global Peace, New York City- Ambassador at Large for Global Peace
 Muse of Poetic Harmony, 2011
 Ambassador of peace and harmony, Global Harmony International, 2010
 Recipient of Pentasi B Universal Inspirational Poet award, 2017

See also
 List of peace activists
 List of African writers by country

References

External links
 Splendors of Dawn website

Nigerian women poets
Living people
Nigerian women lawyers
University of Wisconsin–Madison faculty
Obafemi Awolowo University alumni
University of Lagos alumni
University of Ghana alumni
People from Jos
Nigerian women academics
Nigerian humanitarians
21st-century Nigerian women writers
21st-century Nigerian poets
Year of birth missing (living people)
Nigerian pacifists